In computer graphics, constriction is a method of decreasing the resolution of a video. The video quality is decreased to allow non authorized users to see video with lower degree of detail in cases where extra costs or licensing is required to view the full resolution source.

Examples 
Some videos, such as films, require that a person has a license in order to view or share the content. The owners or creators of the content may not want the public to have access to the full resolution version as that might encourage unauthorised use or distribution of the media. Such behaviour could lead to a monetary loss for the owners. Furthermore, use of the media in other works might lead to the creators being uncredited. Therefore, licensing can also act as a form of permissions, blocking unfavoured parties from abusing the content.

To reduce the resolution of video, the frame of image being shown is rendered in memory with a lower fidelity or detail. Compression techniques may also be used to make the content visibly different than the source. Media that is royalty free or public domain usually do not have any constrictions. Instead of lowering resolution, hindrances such as watermarks may also be used to disincentivize people from accessing or using the content freely.

Implementation 
Constriction can be executed through rather rudimentary software, although it can be accelerated using a video card. Compression is an easy way to lower fidelity, and as a result also reduces the file size, which may help in distributing the media to multiple unlicensed parties.

Computer graphics